Mozilla (stylized as moz://a) is a free software community founded in 1998 by members of Netscape. The Mozilla community uses, develops, spreads and supports Mozilla products, thereby promoting exclusively free software and open standards, with only minor exceptions. The community is supported institutionally by the non-profit Mozilla Foundation and its tax-paying subsidiary, the Mozilla Corporation.

Mozilla's current products include the Firefox web browser, Thunderbird e-mail client (now through a subsidiary), Bugzilla bug tracking system, Gecko layout engine, Pocket "read-it-later-online" service, and others.

History 

On January 23, 1998, Netscape made two announcements. First, that Netscape Communicator would be free; second, that the source code would also be free. One day later, Jamie Zawinski from Netscape registered . The project took its name "Mozilla", after the original code name of the Netscape Navigator browser—a portmanteau of "Mosaic and Godzilla", and used to coordinate the development of the Mozilla Application Suite, the free software version of Netscape's internet software, Netscape Communicator. Jamie Zawinski says he came up with the name "Mozilla" at a Netscape staff meeting. A small group of Netscape employees were tasked with coordination of the new community.

Originally, Mozilla aimed to be a technology provider for companies such as Netscape, who would commercialize their free software code. When AOL (Netscape's parent company) greatly reduced its involvement with Mozilla in July 2003, the Mozilla Foundation was designated the legal steward of the project. Soon after, Mozilla deprecated the Mozilla Suite in favor of creating independent applications for each function, primarily the Firefox web browser and the Thunderbird email client, and moved to supply them directly to the public.

Mozilla's activities have since expanded to include Firefox on mobile platforms (primarily Android), a mobile OS called Firefox OS (since cancelled), a web-based identity system called Mozilla Persona and a marketplace for HTML5 applications.

In a report released in November 2012, Mozilla reported that their total revenue for 2011 was $163 million, which was up 33% from $123 million in 2010. Mozilla noted that roughly 85% of their revenue comes from their contract with Google.

At the end of 2013, Mozilla announced a deal with Cisco Systems, whereby Firefox would download and use a Cisco-provided binary build of an open-source codec to play the proprietary H.264 video format. As part of the deal, Cisco would pay any patent licensing fees associated with the binaries that it distributes. Mozilla's CTO, Brendan Eich, acknowledged that this is "not a complete solution" and isn't "perfect". An employee in Mozilla's video formats team, writing in an unofficial capacity, justified it by the need to maintain their large user base, which would be necessary for future battles for truly free video formats.

In December 2013, Mozilla announced funding for the development of paid games through its Game Creator Challenge. However, even those games that may be released under a non-free software or free software license must be made with open web technologies and Javascript as per the work criteria outlined in the announcement.

In January 2017 the company rebranded away from its dinosaur symbol in favor of a logo that includes a "://" character sequence from a URL, with the revamped logo: "moz://a".

In 2020 Mozilla announced it would be cutting off 25% of its worldwide staff of nearly 1,000 to reduce costs; at United States Federal minimum wage full-time, this would reduce costs by $3.8m, while at an average pay of $50k/year this would represent a $12.5M cost reduction. Firefox has fallen from 30% market share to 4% in 10 years. Despite this, executive pay increased 400%, with Mitchell Baker, Mozilla’s top executive, being paid $2.4m in 2018. In December 2020, Mozilla closed its Mountain View office.

Values

Mozilla Manifesto 

The Mozilla Manifesto outlines Mozilla's goals and principles. It asserts Mozilla's commitment to the internet, saying: "The open, global internet is the most powerful communication and collaboration resource we have ever seen. It embodies some of our deepest hopes for human progress." It then outlines what Mozilla sees as its place in the development of the internet, stating "The Mozilla project uses a community-based approach to create world-class open source software and to develop new types of collaborative activities". And finally, it lays out their ten principles:
 The internet is an integral part of modern life—a key component in education, communication, collaboration, business, entertainment, and society as a whole.
 The internet is a global public resource that must remain open and accessible.
 The internet must enrich the lives of individual human beings.
 Individuals’ security and privacy on the internet are fundamental and must not be treated as optional.
 Individuals must have the ability to shape the internet and their own experiences on it.
 The effectiveness of the internet as a public resource depends upon interoperability (protocols, data formats, content), innovation, and decentralized participation worldwide.
 Free and open source software promotes the development of the internet as a public resource.
 Transparent community-based processes promote participation, accountability, and trust.
 Commercial involvement in the development of the internet brings many benefits; a balance between commercial profit and public benefit is critical.
 Magnifying the public benefit aspects of the internet is an important goal, worthy of time, attention, and commitment.

Pledge 
According to the Mozilla Foundation:

Software

Firefox 

Firefox is a family of software products developed by Mozilla, with the Firefox browser as the flagship product.

Firefox browser 

Firefox browser, or simply Firefox, is a web browser and Mozilla's flagship software product. It is available in both desktop and mobile versions. Firefox uses the Gecko layout engine to render web pages, which implements current and anticipated web standards. , Firefox had approximately 10-11% of worldwide usage share of web browsers, making it the 4th most-used web browser.

Firefox began as an experimental branch of the Mozilla codebase by Dave Hyatt, Joe Hewitt and Blake Ross. They believed the commercial requirements of Netscape's sponsorship and developer-driven feature creep compromised the utility of the Mozilla browser. To combat what they saw as the Mozilla Suite's software bloat, they created a stand-alone browser, with which they intended to replace the Mozilla Suite.

Firefox was originally named Phoenix but the name was changed so as to avoid trademark conflicts with Phoenix Technologies. The initially-announced replacement, Firebird, provoked objections from the Firebird project community. The current name, Firefox, was chosen on February 9, 2004.

It was previously announced that Mozilla is going to launch a premium version of the Firefox browser by October 2019. The company's CEO, Chris Beard, has been quoted by The Next Web to say that "there is no plan to charge money for things that are now free. So we will roll out a subscription service and offer a premium level." In September, Mozilla revealed their new offering, Firefox Premium Support, priced at $10 per installation. However, shortly after news broke of the service, Mozilla removed information about the service from the website. Computerworld reported that in an email statement, Mozilla claimed "the page outlining that these paid support services for enterprise clients will be available was posted incorrectly."

Firefox for mobile 

Firefox for mobile (codenamed Fennec) is the build of the Mozilla Firefox web browser for mobile devices such as smartphones and tablet computers. Initially available on multiple platforms, it is now available in two versions: Firefox for Android and Firefox for iOS. Firefox for Android runs on the Android mobile operating system and uses the same Gecko layout engine as Mozilla Firefox; for example, version 1.0 used the same engine as Firefox 3.6, and the following release, 4.0, shared core code with Firefox 4.0. Firefox for iOS, which runs on the iOS mobile operating system, does not use the Gecko Layout Engine because of Apple's policy that all iOS apps that browse the web must use the built-in iOS WebKit rendering engine. Both version include features like HTML5 support, Firefox Sync, private browsing, web tracking protection, and tabbed browsing, and Firefox for Android also includes support for add-ons.

Firefox Focus 

Firefox Focus is a free and open-source privacy-focused mobile browser for Android and iOS. Initially released in 2015 as only a tracker-blocking application for iOS, it has since been developed into a full mobile browser for both iOS and Android.

Firefox Lockwise 

Firefox Lockwise was a password manager offered by Mozilla. On desktop, it was a built-in feature of the Firefox browser. On mobile, it was offered as a standalone app that can be set as the device's default password manager.

Firefox Monitor 

Firefox Monitor is an online service that informs users if their email address and passwords have been leaked in data breaches.

Firefox Send 

Firefox Send was an online encrypted file-transfer service offered by Mozilla. In September 2020, Mozilla announced that Firefox Send will be decommissioned and will no longer be part of the product lineup.

Mozilla VPN 

Mozilla VPN, formerly Firefox Private Network, is a subscription-based VPN and a free privacy extension.

Firefox Private Relay 
Firefox Private Relay provides users with disposable email addresses that can be used to combat spam (by hiding the user's real email address) and manage email subscriptions by categorizing them based on the party a particular address was given to.

Firefox Reality 
In September 2018, Mozilla announced that its VR version was ready for consumers to download. Called Firefox Reality, the browser was built entirely for virtual reality. It is currently available on the Oculus.

In January 2019, HTC also announced its partnership with Mozilla. Under the partnership, the Firefox Reality web browser has been made available on the Vive headsets.

In February 2022 Mozilla announced that Igalia took over stewardship of this project under the new name of Wolvic.

Firefox OS 

Firefox OS (project name: Boot to Gecko also known as B2G) is a free software operating system that was developed by Mozilla to support HTML5 apps written using "open Web" technologies rather than platform-specific native APIs. The concept behind Firefox OS is that all user-accessible software will be HTML5 applications, that use Open Web APIs to access the phone's hardware directly via JavaScript.

Some devices using this OS include Alcatel One Touch Fire, ZTE Open, and LG Fireweb. Mozilla announced the end of Firefox OS development in December 2015.

A fork of B2G, KaiOS, has continued development and ships with numerous low-cost devices.

Pocket 

Pocket is a mobile application and web service for managing a reading list of articles from the Internet. It was announced that it would be acquired by the Mozilla Corporation, the commercial arm of Mozilla's non-profit development group, on February 27, 2017. Originally designed only for desktop browsers, it is now available for macOS, Windows, iOS, Android, Windows Phone, BlackBerry, Kobo eReaders, and web browsers.

Thunderbird 

Thunderbird is a free software, cross-platform email and news client developed by the volunteers of the Mozilla Community.

On July 16, 2012, Mitchell Baker announced that Mozilla's leadership had come to the conclusion that ongoing stability was the most important thing for Thunderbird and that innovation in Thunderbird was no longer a priority for Mozilla. In that update, Baker also suggested that Mozilla had provided a pathway for its community to innovate around Thunderbird if the community chooses.

SeaMonkey 

SeaMonkey (formerly the Mozilla Application Suite) is a free and open-source cross-platform suite of Internet software components including a web browser component, a client for sending and receiving email and Usenet newsgroup messages, an HTML editor (Mozilla Composer) and the ChatZilla IRC client.

On March 10, 2005, the Mozilla Foundation announced that it would not release any official versions of Mozilla Application Suite beyond 1.7.x, since it had now focused on the stand-alone applications Firefox and Thunderbird. SeaMonkey is now maintained by the SeaMonkey Council, which has trademarked the SeaMonkey name with help from the Mozilla Foundation. The Mozilla Foundation provides project hosting for the SeaMonkey developers.

Bugzilla 

Bugzilla is a web-based general-purpose bug tracking system, which was released as free software by Netscape Communications in 1998 along with the rest of the Mozilla codebase, and is currently stewarded by Mozilla. It has been adopted by a variety of organizations for use as a bug tracking system for both free and open-source software and proprietary projects and products, including the Mozilla Foundation, the Linux kernel, KDE, Red Hat, Eclipse and LibreOffice.

WebThings 
WebThings is a framework that allowed management of IoT devices through a single framework, gateway and UI. It was based on W3C Web of Things standard. As of 2020, it is no longer affiliated with Mozilla. It was spinner of as independent project during 2020 layoff of 250 employees. It was known as Project Things and allowed users to use a raspberry pi as a gateway for IoT management with decentralized software.

Components

NSS 

Network Security Services (NSS) comprises a set of libraries designed to support cross-platform development of security-enabled client and server applications. NSS provides a complete free software implementation of crypto libraries supporting SSL and S/MIME. NSS is licensed under the GPL-compatible Mozilla Public License 2.0.

AOL, Red Hat, Sun Microsystems/Oracle Corporation, Google and other companies and individual contributors have co-developed NSS and it is used in a wide range of non-Mozilla products including Evolution, Pidgin, and LibreOffice.

SpiderMonkey 

SpiderMonkey is the original JavaScript engine developed by Brendan Eich when he invented JavaScript in 1995 as a developer at Netscape. It became part of the Mozilla product family when Mozilla inherited Netscape's code-base in 1998. In 2011, Eich transferred the nominal ownership of the SpiderMonkey code and project to Dave Mandelin.

SpiderMonkey is a cross-platform engine written in C++ which implements ECMAScript, a standard developed from JavaScript. It comprises an interpreter, several just-in-time compilers, a decompiler and a garbage collector. Products which embed SpiderMonkey include Firefox, Thunderbird, SeaMonkey, and many non-Mozilla applications.

Rhino 

Rhino is a free software JavaScript engine managed by the Mozilla Foundation. It is developed entirely in Java. Rhino converts JavaScript scripts into Java classes. Rhino works in both compiled and interpreted mode.

Gecko 

Gecko is a layout engine that supports web pages written using HTML, SVG, and MathML. Gecko is written in C++ and uses NSPR for platform independence. Its source code is licensed under the Mozilla Public License.

Firefox uses Gecko both for rendering web pages and for rendering its user interface. Gecko is also used by Thunderbird, SeaMonkey, and many non-Mozilla applications.

Rust 

Rust is a compiled programming language being developed by Mozilla Research. It is designed for safety, concurrency, and performance. Rust is intended for creating large and complex software which needs to be both safe against exploits and fast.

Rust is being used in an experimental layout engine, Servo, which was developed by Mozilla and Samsung. Servo is not used in any consumer-oriented browsers yet. However, the Servo project developers plan for parts of the Servo source code to be merged into Gecko, and Firefox, incrementally.

XULRunner 

XULRunner is a software platform and technology experiment by Mozilla, that allows applications built with the same technologies used by Firefox extensions (XPCOM, Javascript, HTML, CSS, XUL) to be run natively as desktop applications, without requiring Firefox to be installed on the user's machine. XULRunner binaries are available for the Windows, Linux and OS X operating systems, allowing such applications to be effectively cross-platform.

pdf.js 

Pdf.js is a library developed by Mozilla that allows in-browser rendering of pdf documents using HTML5 Canvas and JavaScript. It is included by default in Firefox, allowing the browser to render pdf documents without requiring an external plugin; and it is available separately as an extension named "PDF Viewer" for Firefox for Android, SeaMonkey, and the Firefox versions which don't include it built-in. It can also be included as part of a website's scripts, to allow pdf rendering for any browser that implements the required HTML5 features and can run JavaScript.

Shumway 

Shumway is a free software replacement for the Adobe Flash Player, developed by Mozilla since 2012, using open web technologies as a replacement for Flash technologies. It uses Javascript and HTML5 Canvas elements to render Flash and execute Actionscript. It is included by default in Firefox Nightly and can be installed as an extension for any recent version of Firefox. The current implementation is limited in its capabilities to render Flash content outside simple projects.

Servo 

Servo is a browser engine being developed for application and embedded use. In August 2020, during the COVID-19 pandemic, due to lack of funds and organization restructuring, Mozilla laid off most of the Servo development team. After the team was disbanded, Servo became part of the Linux Foundation, where development currently continues.

SOPS: Secrets OPerationS 
sops is an editor of encrypted files that supports YAML, JSON, ENV, INI and BINARY formats and encrypts with AWS KMS, GCP KMS, Azure Key Vault, age, and PGP.

WebXR Viewer 
WebXR Viewer is an AR viewer that lets a developer create and run AR experiences built with web technologies and ARKit.

Other activities

Mozilla VR 
Mozilla VR is a team focused on bringing virtual reality (VR) tools, specifications, and standards to the open Web. Mozilla VR maintains A-Frame (VR), a web framework for building VR experiences, and works on advancing WebVR support within web browsers.

On April 26, 2018, the first experiment from their Social Mixed Reality efforts was released; Hubs, a multi-user virtual space in WebVR.

Mozilla Persona 

Mozilla Persona was a secure, cross-browser website authentication mechanism which allowed a user to use a single username and password (or other authentication method) to log into multiple sites. Mozilla Persona shut down on November 30, 2016.

Mozilla Location Service 

This free software crowdsourced geolocation service was started by Mozilla in 2013 and offers a free API.

Webmaker 
Mozilla Webmaker is Mozilla's educational initiative, and Webmaker's goal is to "help millions of people move from using the web to making the web." As part of Mozilla's non-profit mission, Webmaker aims "to help the world increase their understanding of the web, take greater control of their online lives, and create a more web literate planet."

MDN Web Docs 

Mozilla maintains a comprehensive developer documentation website called the MDN Web Docs which contains information about web technologies including HTML, CSS, SVG, JavaScript, as well as Mozilla-specific information. In addition, Mozilla publishes a large number of videos about web technologies and the development of Mozilla projects on the Air Mozilla website. This was renamed to MDN Plus.

Common Voice 

In July 2017, Mozilla launched the project Common Voice to help make voice recognition open to everyone. Visitors to the website can donate their voice to help build a free software voice recognition engine that anyone can use to make apps for devices and the web that make use of voice recognition. The website allows visitors to read a sentence to help the machine system learn how real people speak, as well as validate the read sentences of other people.

Mozilla publishes Common Voice data sets under a CC-0 license.

IRL – Online Life Is Real Life 
On June 26, 2017, Mozilla launched IRL – Online Life Is Real Life to explore popular stories from the web that deal with issues of the internet that affect society as a whole.

Controversies

Eich CEO promotion 
In 2008, Brendan Eich donated US$1,000 in support of California's Proposition 8, a California ballot proposition and state constitutional amendment in opposition to same-sex marriage. Eich's donation eventually became public knowledge in 2012, while he was Mozilla's chief technical officer, leading to angry responses on Twitter—including the use of the hashtag "#wontworkwithbigots".

Controversy later re-emerged in 2014, following the announcement of Eich's appointment as CEO of Mozilla. U.S. companies OkCupid and CREDO Mobile notably objected to his appointment, with the former asking its users to boycott the browser, while Credo amassed 50,000 signatures for a petition that called for Eich's resignation.

Due to the controversy, Eich voluntarily stepped down on April 3, 2014, and Mitchell Baker, executive chairwoman of Mozilla Corporation, posted a statement on the Mozilla blog: "We didn't move fast enough to engage with people once the controversy started. Mozilla believes both in equality and freedom of speech. Equality is necessary for meaningful speech. And you need free speech to fight for equality."

Push Notifications for Mozilla Blog without user consent 
In July 2020 Mozilla forced push notifications, an advertisement for its own blog post about Facebook and Mozilla's #StopHateForProfit campaign. These notifications were sent without user consent and faced a backlash by Firefox users.

Mozilla and Meta (Facebook) partnership 
In February 2022, Mozilla and Meta partnered to propose a privacy-preserving advertising technology. This faced a backlash on the internet because Mozilla partnered with the same company they were running a campaign against 2 years ago and given Meta's reputation, Mozilla was criticized for collaborating with them.

Community 
The Mozilla Community consists of over 40,000 active contributors from across the globe. It includes both paid employees and volunteers who work towards the goals set forth in the Mozilla Manifesto. Many of the sub-communities in Mozilla have formed around localization efforts for Mozilla Firefox, and the Mozilla web properties.

Local communities 

There are a number of sub-communities that exist based on their geographical locations, where contributors near each other work together on particular activities, such as localization, marketing, PR, and user support.

In 2017, Mozilla created a Wireless Innovation for Network Security (WINS) challenge that awarded a total of $2 million in prize money to innovators who used its decentralized design to create wireless solutions for post-natural disaster internet access. This challenge also envisioned connecting communities that lacked internet access.

Mozilla Reps 

The Mozilla Reps program is a volunteer-based program, which allows volunteers to become official representatives of Mozilla. Volunteers are required to be 18 years or older in order to participate in the program. Activities under the program include recruitment for contributors, workshops, and attending Mozilla summits.

Conferences and events

Mozilla Festival 

The Mozilla Festival (MozFest) is a unique hybrid: part art, tech, and society convening, part maker festival, and the premiere gathering for activists in diverse global movements fighting for a more humane digital world. Journalists, coders, filmmakers, designers, educators, gamers, makers, youth, and anyone else, from all over the world, are encouraged to attend, with nearly 10,000 participating virtually in 2021 from more than 87 countries, working together at the intersection of human rights, climate justice, and technology, specifically trustworthy artificial intelligence.

The event revolves around key issues based on the chosen theme for that year's festival. MozFest unfolds over the span of two weeks, with more than 500 interactive sessions, films, talks, round-tables, hack-a-thons, exhibits, and socials. Topics range from privacy best practices, developing solutions to online misinformation and harassment, building free software tools, supporting Trustworthy AI innovations, and more. The titles of the festival revolve around the main theme, freedom, and the Web.

MozCamps 

MozCamps are multi-day gatherings aimed at growing the contributor network by providing lectures, workshops, and breakout sessions led by Mozilla staff and volunteers. While these camps have been held in multiple locations globally in the past, none have occurred since 2014.

Mozilla Summit 

Mozilla Summit was a global event with active contributors and Mozilla employees who collaborated to develop a shared understanding of Mozilla's mission together. Over 2,000 people representing 90 countries and 114 languages gathered in Santa Clara, Toronto, and Brussels in 2013. Mozilla had its last Summit in 2013 and replaced them with smaller all-hands where both employees and volunteers come together to collaborate.

See also 
-zilla
Mozilla (mascot)
The Book of Mozilla
Timeline of web browsers
W3C

References

External links 

, including the Mozilla Manifesto

Mozilla Wiki
Mozilla Mercurial Repository

 
1998 establishments in the United States
Netscape
Projects established in 1998